Brett T. Williams is a retired United States Air Force major general who served as director of operations for U.S. Cyber Command from July 2012 to June 2014.  He retired from the Air Force on June 1, 2014.

Background
Williams earned his commission as a distinguished graduate of the ROTC program at Duke University.  He is a graduate of Euro-NATO Joint Jet Pilot training and the USAF Fighter Weapons Instructor Course.

During his Air Force career, Williams served in four senior leadership positions: As the director of operations (J3) at U.S. Cyber Command, he led a team of 400 people responsible for offensive global operations and defense of all DOD networks; as the director of operations (A3O), he led the service's largest staff directorate, comprising more than 1300 Airmen and civilians stationed worldwide; as the director of communications (J6) for U.S. Pacific Command, his 150-person directorate executed an annual budget of $57 million and was responsible for command and control networks supporting DOD's largest geographic warfighting command; and finally, as the inspector general for Air Combat Command, he was responsible for oversight of all U.S.-based combat flying organizations.

Operationally, Williams led a variety of complex entities ranging in size from 300 to more than 9000 personnel.  His most significant leadership position was as commander of the 18th Wing in Okinawa, Japan, the largest combat wing in the Air Force. Williams was responsible for relationships with Japanese political and business leaders in a highly volatile community environment.  He executed an annual budget in excess of $100 million in support of more than 25,000 U.S. service members, their families and Japanese employees.  Williams is an F-15C fighter pilot with 28 years of flying experience, including more than 100 combat missions.  In 2009, he was presented with the General and Mrs. Jerome F. O'Malley Award.

He is a command pilot with more than 3,700 hours in the F-15C and more than 100 combat missions in operations Desert Shield, Desert Storm, Southern Watch, Northern Watch, and Iraqi Freedom.

Current activities
Williams is a founder of IronNet Cybersecurity, Inc., and is president of its operations, training and security division.  As a leading expert on cybersecurity, Williams has appeared on NBC's Meet the Press with Chuck Todd, ABC's This Week with George Stephanopoulos and MSNBC's The Last Word with Lawrence O'Donnell.

He conducts cyber-risk training seminars as a faculty member of the National Association of Corporate Directors, and is chairman of the advisory board for the Duke University School of Nursing.  He serves on a board for Ciena Government Solutions Inc., and serves on the board of advisors for TRI-COR Industries, an IT services firm.

Education

Assignments

Flight information
Rating: Command pilot
Flight hours: More than 3,700
Aircraft flown: F-15C

Publications
"Effects-Based Operations: Theory, Application and the Role of Airpower," published as Chapter 5, Transformation Concepts for National Security in the 21st Century, Williamson Murray, Editor, September 2002 
"10 Propositions Regarding Cyberspace Operations," Joint Force Quarterly, Issue 61, 2d October 2011 
"Cyberspace: What is it, where is it and who cares?" Armed Forces Journal, March 13, 2014 
"The Joint Force Commander’s Guide to Cyberspace Operations," Joint Force Quarterly, Issue 73, 2d Quarter 2014

Effective dates of promotion

References

External links
Biography of Major General Brett Williams, USAF, Retrieved June 18, 2017

Recipients of the Air Force Distinguished Service Medal
Recipients of the Legion of Merit
Recipients of the Distinguished Flying Cross (United States)
Living people
Duke University alumni
Recipients of the Defense Superior Service Medal
Year of birth missing (living people)
Recipients of the Meritorious Service Medal (United States)